is a Japanese diplomat and academic, a former Ambassador of Japan to the United Nations and a former Chairman of UNICEF in 1988.

He received a B.A. and an M.A. from Hitotsubashi University, and then earned a B.A. at St John's College, Cambridge in 1959. He joined the Japanese Ministry of Foreign Affairs in 1959, and served in international organizations including the United Nations, GATT and the OECD. He was Ambassador of Japan to the United Nations from 1986 to 1989. In this capacity, he was also Vice Chairman (1987–1988) and Chairman (1988) of the UNICEF Executive Board at the international level. He was Deputy Secretary-General of OECD from 1990 to 1996. After retiring from the diplomatic service he became professor in the Institute of Asia-Pacific Studies at Waseda University.

References

Chairmen and Presidents of UNICEF
Living people
Hitotsubashi University alumni
Year of birth missing (living people)
Japanese officials of the United Nations
Permanent Representatives of Japan to the United Nations